Dendrolasma is a genus of harvestmen in the family Nemastomatidae. There are about five described species in Dendrolasma.

Species
These five species belong to the genus Dendrolasma:
 Cladolasma ailaoshan Suzuki, 1963
 Cladolasma damingshan
 Dendrolasma dentipalpe Shear & Gruber, 1983
 Dendrolasma mirabile Banks, 1894
 Dendrolasma mirabilis Banks, 1894b

References

External links

 

Harvestmen
Articles created by Qbugbot
Taxa named by Nathan Banks